Maurizio Carnino (born 7 March 1975 in Turin) is an Italian short track speed skater and long track speed skater. He is a four-time Olympian, competing in the 1994 Lillehammer, 1998 Nagano, 2002 Salt Lake City, and 2006 Turin Winter Olympics.

Career

Short track career
A specialist in the shorter distances, Carnino was long a dependable member of the Italian short track speed skating relay team. At the 1994 Winter Olympics in Lillehammer, Carnino, as an 18-year-old, was a member of the Italian relay team which won the gold medal in the 5000 metre relay competition along with Orazio Fagone, Hugo Herrnhof and Mirko Vuillermin.

Four years later Carnino competed in the 1998 Winter Olympics where he finished fourth in the 5000 metre relay and 15th in the 500 metres.

At the 2002 Winter Olympics in Salt Lake City, Canino was part of the Italian relay team along with Nicola Franceschina, Nicola Rodigari, Fabio Carta and Michele Antonioli, and the team won the silver medal in the 5000 metre relay competition. Carnino was the only skater from 1994 still on the team.

Long track career
With the 2006 Winter Olympics being held in his native Turin, Carnino decided to switch to long track speed skating. He placed second at the 2005 and 2006 national sprint speed skating championships, and qualified for the Olympics, where he finished 30th in the 1000 metres and 31st in the 500 metres.

External links
 
 Maurizio Carnino at the ISU

1973 births
Living people
Italian male short track speed skaters
Olympic short track speed skaters of Italy
Olympic speed skaters of Italy
Short track speed skaters at the 1994 Winter Olympics
Short track speed skaters at the 1998 Winter Olympics
Short track speed skaters at the 2002 Winter Olympics
Speed skaters at the 2006 Winter Olympics
Olympic gold medalists for Italy
Olympic silver medalists for Italy
Sportspeople from Turin
Olympic medalists in short track speed skating
Medalists at the 2002 Winter Olympics
Medalists at the 1994 Winter Olympics